Slavia Prague is a professional Czech football club which is based in the Vršovice district of Prague and plays their home matches at the Sinobo Stadium, an arena with a seating capacity of 20,232. The club has been established on 2 November 1892 as a cycling club and ranks as the oldest Czech sports organization formed in the country. The joint-shareholders are the real estate company Sinobo Group and the finance corporation CITIC Limited who share an unrevealed proportion of stocks, both companies based out from mainland China.

Slavia competes in the Czech First League and is one of four teams never relegated from the league since its inception in September 1993 after the country's rebirth. In terms of football achievements Slavia is the second-most successful club  of the Czechoslovak First League and acquired second-most points in the Czech first league. Since 1925 there have been 71 completed seasons of Czechoslovak league and 28 completed Czech league seasons, in which Slavia has won 21 league titles, nine Czech cups, two doubles (in 2019 and 2021) and one Czechoslovak Supercup.

In the title-winning 2020-21 the team completed an entire season undefeated and set a Czech record for the longest top-flight unbeaten league run at 46 games between 2020 and 2021.

All statistics are correct as of 30 May 2021.

Statistics 

Slavia Prague's tally of 21 League titles is the second-highest in Czech football, after Sparta Prague. As of May 2021, they are one of five teams, the others being FC Viktoria Plzeň, FC Baník Ostrava and FC Slovan Liberec, that has won the Czech Football League since its reformation in 1993. Slavia also holds 5 Czech Cups and has achieved two League and Cup "doubles" (in 2019 and 2021).

Slavia is one of three teams that have not been relegated from the top tier of Czech football since 1993, the other two being Sparta Prague and Slovan Liberec.

Vlastimil Kopecký holds the record for Slavia appearances, having played 953 first-team matches between 1932 and 1950, while the second most appearances are linked to František Veselý (920) followed by Bohumil Smolík (772). Josef Bican is the club's top goalscorer with 417 goals between 1937 and 1948. The only other player to score 200 or more goals in the Czech or Czechoslovak top tier is Vlastimil Kopecký. Antonín Puč spent almost two decades in red and white, mostly as a left-winger, and scored 112 league goals for the club.

Taking into consideration solely the Czech First League statistics since 1993, the record for the most Slavia Prague appearances is held by Milan Škoda (214), followed by David Hubáček (199) and goalkeeper Radek Černý (193). Slavia's top league goal scorer since 1993 is Milan Škoda (77), followed by Stanislav Vlček (44) and Tomáš Došek (40). The most clean sheets by Slavia goalkeeper were 86 by Radek Černý, followed by Ondřej Kolář (45) and Jan Stejskal (42). In the 2019/20 season Ondřej Kolář has established few records for Slavia's goalkeeping – the most clean sheets in a single season (23) and the most consecutive minutes without conceding a goal (789 mins), while Slavia Prague's defense conceded 12 goals in the entire season – another best. Kolář also became the fastest goalkeeper of the Czech First League to keep 50 clean sheets, which took him 101 games (with all clubs).

Team records

Player records

Attendance records

Coach records

Transfer records 

Arrivals

Departures

Recent top goalscorers

References

SK Slavia Prague